Gooderham is a surname. Notable people with the surname include:

 Albert Gooderham (1861–1935), Canadian distiller and financier
 Bill Gooderham (1919–1979), sailor
 George Horace Gooderham (1868–1942), Canadian businessman and politician
 Hector Gooderham (1909–1977), Scottish Episcopalian priest
 Peter Gooderham (born 1954), British diplomat
 William Gooderham, Sr. (1790–1881), Canadian distiller, businessman, and banker

See also
 Gooderham and Worts, Canadian distillery company 
 Gooderham Building, prominent landmark in Toronto
 Gooderham, Ontario, a community in Highlands East, Ontario
 Gooderham/Pencil Lake Water Aerodrome, aerodrome near Gooderham, Ontario